Saleh moshatat (also Romanized as saleh moshatat and saleh moshatat) is a city in Sorkheh Rural District, Fath Olmobin District, Shush County, Khuzestan Province, Iran. At the 2006 census, its population was 2,428, in 374 families.

References 

Populated places in Shush County
Cities in Khuzestan Province